(Edwin) Lisle Marsden, M.A. (Lambeth) (20 September 1886 - 21 June 1960) was  Archdeacon of Lindsey from 1948 until his death.

Marsen was educated at The King's School, Chester after which he a clerk with the National Provincial Bank. He was ordained Deacon in 1912, and Priest in 1913. After a curacy in Spalding he was a Chaplain to the British Armed Forces from 1917 to 1919 during which time he was mentioned in dispatches. He was Vicar of Pinchbeck from 1918 to 1921; Aspull from 1921 to 1928. He became the incumbent at St Michael and All Angels, Wigan in 1928; and of  Great Grimsby in 1951. He was Proctor in Convocation from 1942 to 1948, and again from 1951 until his death.

Notes

1886 births
1948 deaths
Archdeacons of Lindsey
20th-century English Anglican priests
Holders of a Lambeth degree
People educated at The King's School, Chester
English bankers
People from Wigan
20th-century English businesspeople